Statiras Records is a sub-label of Progressive Records which Progressive founder Gus Statiras launched in the 1980s that recorded jazz musical artists for release on LP and CD.

Albums

 SLP-8074 Jazz Piano - Judy Carmichael, 1983

References

American record labels
Jazz record labels